Abramovo is a rural locality (a village) in Sarginsky Selsoviet of Krasnooktyabrsky District, Nizhny Novgorod Oblast, Russia.

Population
The population was 116 as of 2010.

Geography 
The village is located on the right bank of the Pyana River, 41 km south of Urazovka (the district's administrative centre) by road. Sarga is the nearest rural locality.

References 

Rural localities in Nizhny Novgorod Oblast
Krasnooktyabrsky District, Nizhny Novgorod Oblast